Anserinus may refer to:

A biological word meaning 'goose-like'
Pes anserinus (disambiguation), anatomical term meaning "goose footed"